Alexander Hamilton Conner (August 5, 1831 – May 29, 1891) was a United States politician and legislator.

Born in Hamilton County, Indiana, Conner was the son of William Conner, a pioneer and politician. He was admitted to the Indiana bar in 1855. He served in the Indiana House of Representatives in 1856. In 1860, Conner took part in the Republican Convention that nominated Abraham Lincoln. Conner was a newspaper publisher and was appointed postmaster for Indianapolis, Indiana. In 1871, President Ulysses S. Grant appointed Conner Governor of Idaho Territory, but he declined the office. After dealing with financial problems with his newspaper in Indianapolis, Conner moved to Kearney, Nebraska, in 1872, where he practiced law. Conner served in the Nebraska Constitutional Convention of 1875 and was elected to the Nebraska State Senate serving in 1883-1885 and 1889-1891. Conner died in Kearney, Nebraska.

Notes

People from Hamilton County, Indiana
Politicians from Indianapolis
People from Kearney, Nebraska
Republican Party members of the Indiana House of Representatives
Republican Party Nebraska state senators
Indiana lawyers
Nebraska lawyers
Editors of Indiana newspapers
1831 births
1891 deaths
19th-century American politicians
Indiana postmasters
19th-century American lawyers
19th-century American newspaper editors